The following are the national records in athletics in Luxembourg maintained by its national athletics federation: Fédération Luxembourgeoise d'Athlétisme (FLA).

Outdoor
Key to tables:

Men

Women

Indoor

Men

Women

Notes

References
General
Luxembourgish records – Men outdoor 31 October 2021 updated
Luxembourgish records – Women outdoor 31 October 2021 updated
Luxembourgish records – Men indoor 31 March 2022 updated
Luxembourgish records – Women indoor 31 March 2022 updated
Specific

External links
FLA web site

Luxembourg
Records
Athletics